Our Lady of Lourdes Church is a historic Roman Catholic Church dedicated to Our Lady of Lourdes situated at Kanajar near Karkala, India. The church was built in 1938. This church comes under Deanery of Karkala, Roman Catholic Diocese of Udupi.

History
Before 1930 the faithful residing at Kanajar as well from the surrounding villages Ninjoor, Palli, Kowdoor and Bailoor had to travel to churches in the distant parishes of Attur Church or Moodubelle. Fr. Cashmere Fernandes, the priest at Moodubelle parish, thought of establishing a parish in this area; his assistant vicar Fr. William Antony Lewis took over the responsibility of the project. At the time, the villages of Kowdoor and Bailoor were affiliated to Attur Church, while the villages of Kanajar, Ninjoor and Palli were affiliated to Moodubelle parish. Lewis had chosen sites near Ninjoor and near Palli. He acquired a site near a place called "Madmalkal", which means Bride's Rock. The land measured 4 1/2 acre and was purchased from Das Hegde for an amount of Rs.240 in the year 1932. The amount was raised during the Confraternity feast of Moodubelle parish.

A well was dug and cemetery was formed on the land during this time. Fr. Salvadore D'Souza, the vicar of Attur parish, suggested that the parish be devoted to Lady of Lourdes, which was subsequently sanctioned by Bishop Victor Rosario Fernandes.

In the 1933 a shelter was built by Lewis out of wooden pillars, with a thatched roof. Every Sundays Lewis use to walk from Hangarakatte to celebrate the mass. The first mass was performed on 25 April 1933. On weekdays the structure was used for the primary schooling of the children. On 24 April 1934 the parish feast was celebrated for the first time. Fr. Julian D'Souza presided over the mass, while the sermon was given by Fr. Denis Lewis. In October of subsequent years a caucus used to take place for the discussions on the parish feast and to decide its precentor. As the expense of luncheon for the priests attending the feast, ten families from each ward had to owe 8 annas. At the time the annual due towards the church was 1 rupee.

After two years, Fr. Lewis planned to build a chapel and a priest's house. A caucus was held, which was attended by the heads of several families. On 25 February 1934, the foundation stone was laid and was blessed by the bishop.

Demographics
The parish has 395 families with a population of 1117 members.

Significance
Madmalkal, or the Bride's Rock, has its own legend. In olden days, if a bride prayed at the rock by offering flowers to it, the next day she would get enough jewelry at the rock for her wedding. With the wedding over, the jewelry had to be returned to the rock. But once a selfish lady had kept a trinket for herself from the jewelry while returning it back to the rock. So the miracle ceased to happen from that day. Also the legend has it that a big seven headed shining serpent used to appear around the rock during nights. To overcome this belief, Fr. William Lewis built a cross over this rock in the year 1932.

In the year 1958, on the occasion of the centennial celebrations of the apparition of Lady Lourdes, our church was declared as a pilgrimage center.

Current structure
In 1943 the foundation stone for the new church was laid and blessed by Rev. V R Fernandes. Stonemasons who hailed from Coimbatore built the belfry. The altar was constructed at Jeppu workshop. During the construction, Fr. Buthelo from Belman used to visit here and give his advice. The building was completed within five years. On 26 April 1948, the church was inaugurated and was blessed by the bishop. The altar was consecrated the next day. Grand celebration of the titular feast took place on every 11 February, in the subsequent years.

Administration
 Fr. Francis D'Souza, who came from Attur, became the parish priest for the period 1957-58
 Fr. Ligory D'Souza was the next priest for the period 1958-59
 Fr. Santhan Fernandes was the next priest to reign for the period 1959-67.
 Fr. Charles Saldanha was the next priest for the period 1967-74.
 Fr. Norbert Fernandes came as new priest in the year 1974.
 Fr. Francis Serao was the next priest to reign the parish for the period 1975-77.
 Fr. Jose Menezes became the new priest for the period 1977-86.
 Fr. Albert Menezes was the next parish priest for the period 1986-91.
 Fr. Alex Aranha was the next parish priest for the period 1991-98.
 Fr. Remigius Aranha became the parish priest for the period 1998-2004.
 Fr. Alwyn D'Cunha took over reigns for the period of 2004-2011.
 Fr. Dr. John Mendonca became the parish priest for the period 2011-2014.
 Fr. Alexander Lewis is the current parish priest.

See also
Roman Catholicism in Mangalore
Goan Catholics
Roman Catholic Diocese of Udupi
Roman Catholic Archdiocese of Bangalore
St. Lawrence Shrine, Attur, Karkala

References

Churches in Mangalore Diocese
Buildings and structures in Udupi district
Christian organizations established in 1938
1938 establishments in India